Niccolò Lippomano was a Roman Catholic prelate who served as Bishop of Bergamo (1512–1516).

Biography
On 16 Jul 1512, Niccolò Lippomano was appointed during the papacy of Pope Julius II as Bishop of Bergamo.
He served as Bishop of Bergamo until his resignation in 1516.

References

External links and additional sources
 (for Chronology of Bishops) 
 (for Chronology of Bishops) 

16th-century Roman Catholic bishops in the Republic of Venice
Bishops appointed by Pope Julius II
Bishops of Bergamo